Fabio Hofer (born 23 January 1991) is an Austrian professional ice hockey centre playing for EHC Biel of the National League (NL). Hofer plays in Switzerland with a Swiss player-license.

He has previously played in the NL with HC Ambrì-Piotta, he originally played in the Austrian Hockey League (EBEL) with EC Red Bull Salzburg and EHC Black Wings Linz.

References

External links

1991 births
Living people
Austrian ice hockey centres
HC Ambrì-Piotta players
EHC Biel players
EHC Black Wings Linz players
People from Lustenau
EC Red Bull Salzburg players
Sportspeople from Vorarlberg